is a passenger railway station operated by the Takamatsu-Kotohira Electric Railroad in Takamatsu, Kagawa, Japan.  It is operated by the private transportation company Takamatsu-Kotohira Electric Railroad (Kotoden) and is designated station "K00" and "N00".

Lines

Layout
The station consists of two bay platforms serving three tracks.

Adjacent stations

History
The section between Kawaramachi and this station on the Kotohira Line was fully opened at the end of 1948 after the war as a substitute route for the city line that was abolished due to the damage caused by the air raids on Takamatsu. Before that, this site was the moat of Takamatsu Castle, and the moat, which is now adjacent to Platform 1, continued to the site of this station. Takamatsu-Chikkō Station opened on December 26, 1948 as Chikkō Station. It was treated as a temporary station until the current station was completed. On January 1, 1954, the name was changed to Takamatsu-Chikkō Station. It was relocated 210 meters north of its original location on September 10, 1955. In 2000 the station building was reconstructed.

Surrounding area
Takamatsu Port
JR Shikoku Takamatsu Station
Takamatsu Symbol Tower
Takamatsu Castle

Passenger statistics

See also
 List of railway stations in Japan

References

External links

  

Railway stations in Japan opened in 1948
Railway stations in Takamatsu